Aldemir Martins (born in Ceará on November 8, 1922; died in São Paulo on February 6, 2006) was a Brazilian artist. He is noted for paintings, drawings, and illustrations which depicted the flora and fauna of his native state.

Bird (1957) is held by the Museum of Modern Art.

Awards 
1959 Prêmio Jabuti

References 

People from Ceará
1922 births
2006 deaths
20th-century Brazilian painters
20th-century Brazilian male artists